Functioning on Impatience is the second full-length album by American metalcore band Coalesce, originally released in 1998 through Second Nature Recordings. The LP edition of the record was repressed for the album's 10th anniversary in 2008, featuring a uniquely cut sleeve shaped after the rib cage on the cover art. The CD edition features a transparent front insert.

Track listing

Personnel

Band
James Dewees - Drums
Nathan Ellis - Guitar (Bass), Vocals
Sean Ingram - Vocals
Jes Steineger - Guitar, Vocals

Production
Ed Rose - Producer, Engineer
Steve Heritage - Mastering

Design
Carrie Whitney - Photography 
Matt Jones - Art Direction, Design

References

Coalesce (band) albums
1998 albums
Albums produced by Ed Rose